William Shakespeare (1564–1616) was an English poet and playwright. He wrote approximately 39 plays and 154 sonnets, as well as a variety of other poems.

Plays and work

Tragedies

Comedies

Histories

Selected poems

Apocrypha
The Shakespeare apocrypha is a group of plays and poems that have sometimes been attributed to Shakespeare, but whose attribution is questionable for various reasons.

Notes

References 

 
Bibliographies by writer
Bibliographies of British writers
Poetry bibliographies
Dramatist and playwright bibliographies
Shakespeare-related lists